One third of Daventry District Council in Northamptonshire, England was elected each year, followed by one year when there was an election to Northamptonshire County Council instead. Since the last boundary changes in 1999, 38 councillors were elected from 24 wards. In another boundary review in 2012 the councillors were reduced to 36 councillors across 16 wards. The council was abolished in 2021, with the area becoming part of West Northamptonshire.

Political control
From the foundation of the council in 1973 until its abolition in 2021, political control of the council was held by the following parties:

Leadership
The leaders of the council from 1999 until the council's abolition in 2021 were:

Council elections
1973 Daventry District Council election
1976 Daventry District Council election
1979 Daventry District Council election (New ward boundaries)
1980 Daventry District Council election
1982 Daventry District Council election
1983 Daventry District Council election
1984 Daventry District Council election
1986 Daventry District Council election
1987 Daventry District Council election
1988 Daventry District Council election (District boundary changes took place but the number of seats remained the same)
1990 Daventry District Council election
1991 Daventry District Council election
1992 Daventry District Council election
1994 Daventry District Council election
1995 Daventry District Council election
1996 Daventry District Council election
1998 Daventry District Council election
1999 Daventry District Council election (New ward boundaries)
2000 Daventry District Council election
2002 Daventry District Council election
2003 Daventry District Council election
2004 Daventry District Council election
2006 Daventry District Council election
2007 Daventry District Council election
2008 Daventry District Council election
2010 Daventry District Council election
2011 Daventry District Council election
2012 Daventry District Council election (New ward boundaries)
2014 Daventry District Council election
2015 Daventry District Council election
2016 Daventry District Council election
2018 Daventry District Council election

Changes between elections

1999 boundaries

2012 boundaries 
Conservative councillor Frank Wiig (Brixworth) dies. The seat was held by the Conservatives in a by-election on 15 November 2012.

Conservative councillor Nick Bunting (Brixworth) resigned from the council. The seat was held by the Conservatives in a by-election on 2 May 2013.

Conservative councillor Kay Driver (Welford) resigned from the council. The seat was held by the Conservatives in a by-election on 2 May 2013.

Conservative councillor Ken Melling (Ravensthorpe) dies. The seat was held by the Conservatives in a by-election on 5 September 2013.

Conservative councillor Diana Osborne (Long Buckby) resigned from the council in March 2017. The seat was held by the Conservatives in a by-election on 4 May. New councillor Malcolm Robert Longley's term ends in 2019.

 
Conservative councillor Ann Carter (Walgrave) resigned from the council in March 2018. The seat was contested in a by-election on 3 May. There are elections due in most other wards in Daventry on the same day.

Conservative councillor Fabienne Fraser-Allen (Brixworth) was forced to resign from the council due to non-attendance in June 2019. The seat was contested in a by-election on 18 July 2019 .    The term is due to end in 2020 but may be extended one year due to the creation of a new West Northamptonshire Authority .

Labour councillor Aiden Ramsey resigned as he moved away from the area after being elected in 2018. The seat was contested in a by-election on 24 October 2019 . The term was due to end in 2022 but ended in 2021 due to the creation of a new West Northamptonshire Council.

References

By-election results

External links
Daventry District Council

 
Council elections in Northamptonshire
District council elections in England